Asa Lanova (born Maryse Jaton; 17 March 1933 – 26 December 2017) was a Swiss dancer and Suisse Romande author.

Biography
Asa Lanova was born in Switzerland, spending her youth in Lausanne. At 17, she went to Paris to study dance where she performed with dancers such as Maurice Béjart. She returned to Switzerland in 1956, performing at the Zürich Opera House and the Grand Théâtre de Genève.

After leaving her dance career, Lanova began to write novels, publishing her first, La dernière migration, in 1977. After switching to a different publisher, Bernard Campiche, Lanova received recognition for her work, winning prizes for both Le Blues d'Alexandrie and La Gazelle tartare.

In 1965, she married fellow dancer Philippe Dahlmann. Lanova died at her home in Pully on 26 December 2017.

Literary prizes
2009 - Prix culturel vaudois Littérature for her literary work.
2005 - 5,000 SFr Schiller Prize for La Gazelle tartare.
1999 - Prix Bibliothèque pour Tous (BPT) (now Prix Bibliomedia Suisse) for Le Blues d'Alexandrie.

Publications
 La dernière migration, Paris, Régine Deforges, 1977
 Crève l'amour, Paris, éditions Acropole, 1984; Orbe, Bernard Campiche éditeur,  « CamPoche», 2006
 Le cœur tatoué, Paris, éditions Mazarine, 1988
 L'étalon de ténèbre, Paris, Régine Deforges, 1991; Vevey, Éditions de l'Aire, 1999
 Le testament d'une mante religieuse, Vevey, éditions de l'Aire, 1995
  Le blues d'Alexandrie Orbe, Bernard Campiche éditeur, 1998 
 Les jardins de Shalalatt Orbe, Bernard Campiche éditeur, 2001
  La Gazelle tartare, Orbe, Bernard Campiche éditeur, 2004
 La nuit du destin, Orbe, Bernard Campiche éditeur, 2007
 Les heures nues, Orbe, Bernard Campiche éditeur, 2011

References

1933 births
2017 deaths
Swiss ballerinas
Swiss women novelists
People from Lausanne